The 3rd edition of the annual Holland Ladies Tour was held from September 5 to September 9, 2000. The women's stage race with an UCI rating of 2.9.2 started in Bergeijk, and ended in Dronten.

Stages

2000-09-05: Bergeijk — Bergeijk (120 km) 

Source: cyclingnews.com

2000-09-06: Tegelen — Tegelen (115 km) 

Source: cyclingnews.com

2000-09-07: Neerijnen — Neerijnen (124 km) 

Source: cyclingnews.com

2000-09-08: Valkenburg — Valkenburg (88.4 km) 

Source: cyclingnews.com

2000-09-09: Dronten — Dronten (80 km) 

Source: cyclingnews.com

2000-09-09: Dronten — Dronten (19.3 km) 

Source: cyclingnews.com

Final standings

General classification

Points classification

Mountains classification

Best young rider classification

Sprint classification

Teams 
 Farm-Frites Hartol
 Dutch National Team
 Westland Wil Vooruit
 Ondernemers van Nature
 Vlaanderen 2002
 Alberts Vrienden
 German National Team
 Norwegian National Team
 Red-Bull
 Team Ahoy-Tuscany-Spain
 Bulls-Team Kupfernagel
 Team Letchworth
 Trek-Sjef van Bergen
 Rodania Sponsor

References 

2000
Holland Ladies Tour
Ronde
Cycling in Limburg (Netherlands)
Cycling in Bergeijk
Cycling in Dronten
Cycling in Valkenburg aan de Geul
Cycling in West Betuwe
Sport in Venlo